Riikka Sarasoja-Lilja (born February 23, 1982, in Lempäälä, Pirkanmaa) is a Finnish cross-country skier who has competed since 2001. At the 2010 Winter Olympics in Vancouver, she finished eighth in the team sprint, 13th in the 30 km, 21st in the 7.5 km + 7.5 km double pursuit, and 31st in the 10 km events.

At the FIS Nordic World Ski Championships 2009 in Liberec, Sarasoja finished 21st in the individual sprint, 24th in the 7.5 km + 7.5 km double pursuit, and 25th in the 30 km events.

Her best World Cup finish was sixth in a sprint event in Finland in 2009.

Cross-country skiing results
All results are sourced from the International Ski Federation (FIS).

Olympic Games

World Championships
1 medal – (1 bronze)

World Cup

Team podiums

6 podiums – (6 )

References

External links

1982 births
Living people
People from Lempäälä
Cross-country skiers at the 2010 Winter Olympics
Cross-country skiers at the 2014 Winter Olympics
Finnish female cross-country skiers
Olympic cross-country skiers of Finland
Universiade medalists in cross-country skiing
Universiade silver medalists for Finland
Competitors at the 2003 Winter Universiade
Sportspeople from Pirkanmaa
21st-century Finnish women